Thought vector is a term popularized by Geoffrey Hinton, the prominent deep-learning researcher now at Google, which uses vectors based on natural language to improve its search results.

References

Search algorithms